The 1924 United States presidential election in Nebraska took place on November 4, 1924 as part of the 1924 United States presidential election. Voters chose eight representatives, or electors to the Electoral College, who voted for president and vice president.

Nebraska was won by incumbent Republican president, Calvin Coolidge with a margin of 18.49%.

Results

Results by county

See also
 United States presidential elections in Nebraska

Notes

References

Nebraska
1924
1924 Nebraska elections